Beauzelle is a commune in the Haute-Garonne department in southwestern France.

Population

See also
Communes of the Haute-Garonne department
Beauzac
Beauziac

References

Communes of Haute-Garonne